Urodeta crenata is a moth of the family Elachistidae. It is found in Cameroon.

The wingspan is 5-5.2 mm. The thorax, tegula and forewing are strongly mottled with scales, which are white basally and dark brown distally. The hindwings are brownish grey. Adults have been recorded in early May.

Etymology
The species name is derived from the Latin crena (meaning serration, notch) and the suffix -ata (meaning provided with) and refers to the serrated sacculus of valva.

References

Endemic fauna of Cameroon
Elachistidae
Moths described in 2011
Insects of Cameroon
Moths of Africa